Penoje is a settlement on the right bank of the Dravinja River southeast of Loče in the Municipality of Slovenske Konjice in eastern Slovenia. The area is part of the traditional region of Styria and is now included in the Savinja Statistical Region.

References

External links
Penoje at Geopedia

Populated places in the Municipality of Slovenske Konjice